Sargus iridatus, the iridescent centurion, is a European species of soldier fly.

Description
The body length is 6.0 to 11.0 mm.
Like Sargus cuprarius, it is almost entirely purple. It has black antennae, the third segment of the antenna in males being shorter than the second.
It has a whitish proboscis; the face and frons are metallic green. There are two clearly delineated white spots at the base of the antennae better developed in females. The thorax has blue reflections. It has black legs, with knees barely paler. The wings are uniformly smoky.
It has dirty yellowish halteres. The abdomen is less violet, with black sternites.

Biology
It is found in open and wooded habitats. Larval habitats are in dung, decomposing vegetable matter and compost.

Distribution
Its distribution covers western Europe, northern, and southern Europe, north up to Finland and European Russia.

References

Stratiomyidae
Diptera of Europe
Insects described in 1763
Taxa named by Giovanni Antonio Scopoli